Rise Up is an album released by Peter Frampton in 1980. As Frampton stated: "This album was released in Brazil to promote our tour there in 1980 - the album eventually turned into Breaking All the Rules, released the next year.".

Track listing

 "You Kill Me" - 4:13 (Frampton)
 "I Don't Wanna Let You Go" - 4:21 (Frampton)
 "Rise Up" - 3:46 (Alessi Brothers)
"Breaking All The Rules" - 5:07 (Frampton, Keith Reid)
"Wasting The Night Away" - 4:12 (Frampton)
"Midland Maniac" - 4:18 (Originally by Steve Winwood, lyrics reworked by Peter Frampton)
"I Can't Stand It (Live)" - 4:13 (Frampton)
"I'm in You (Live)" - 4:10 (Frampton)

Personnel
Peter Frampton - electric guitar, acoustic guitar, keyboards, vocals
Bos Sabino - keyboards on "Midland Maniac"
Bob Mayo - keyboards, guitar, backing vocals on "I Can't Stand It" and "I'm in You"
John Regan - bass guitar
Stanley Sheldon - bass guitar, backing vocals on "I Can't Stand It"
Gary Mallaber - drums on "I Can't Stand It"
Jamie Oldaker - drums
Anton Fig - drums on "Rise Up"
Billy Alessi - Yamaha CP 70 and Korg ES 50 on "Rise Up"
Elliot Randall - backing guitar on "Breaking All The Rules"

Peter Frampton albums
1980 EPs
Albums produced by Peter Frampton